Bloomfield Cricket and Athletic Club is a first-class cricket team based in Colombo, Sri Lanka. It is one of Sri Lanka's oldest cricket clubs founded in 1892 and competes in the Premier Trophy, which it has won eight times.

History
The club was founded in 1892.

Current squad
Players with international caps are listed in bold

Honours
 P Saravanamuttu Trophy (3) 
1963–64
1994–95
1996–97

 Robert Senanayake Trophy (2) 
1980–81 
1981–82

 Lakspray Trophy (1) 
1982–83

 Premier Trophy (2) 
1998–99
2003–04

Bristol Trophy Under 25 (2)
1983
1984

Club Presidents
 Shelley Wickramasinghe (1972–73)
 Shelley Wickramasinghe (1976–77)
 Shelley Wickramasinghe (1979 to 2000)

References

External links
 Bloomfield Team on Batsman
 Cricinfo
 Bloomfield Cricket and Athletic Club at CricketArchive

Sri Lankan first-class cricket teams
Sports clubs in Colombo